St. Michael's Cemetery may refer to:

St. Michael's Cemetery (Toronto), Canada
St Michael's Cemetery, Sheffield, England
St. Michael's Cemetery (New York), United States
St. Michael's Cemetery (Pensacola), United States

See also
St. Michael's Catholic Cemetery, Happy Valley, Hong Kong
St. Michael's Churchyard (disambiguation)